Helsinki Cathedral is the Finnish Evangelical Lutheran cathedral of the Diocese of Helsinki, located in the neighborhood of Kruununhaka in the centre of Helsinki, Finland, at the Senate Square. The church was originally built from 1830 to 1852 as a tribute to the Grand Duke of Finland, Tsar Nicholas I of Russia. It was also known as St Nicholas's Church until the independence of Finland in 1917. It is a major landmark of the city, and possibly the most famous structure in Finland as a whole when viewed globally.

Description
A distinctive landmark in the Helsinki cityscape, with its tall, green dome surrounded by four smaller domes, the building is in the neoclassical style. It was designed by Carl Ludvig Engel as the climax of his Senate Square layout: it is surrounded by other, smaller buildings designed by him.

The church's plan is a Greek cross (a square centre and four equilateral arms), symmetrical in each of the four cardinal directions, with each arm's facade featuring a colonnade and pediment. Engel originally intended to place a further row of columns on the western end to mark the main entrance opposite the eastern altar, but this was never built.

History
After Helsinki was made into the capital of Finland in 1812, Alexander I decreed in 1814 that 15 percent of the salt import tax were to be collected into a fund for two churches, one Lutheran and one Orthodox. The cathedral was built on the site of the smaller 1724–1727 , which had been dedicated to its patroness, Ulrika Eleonora, Queen of Sweden. Helsinki Old Church was built between 1824 and 1826 in nearby Kamppi to serve the parish while the Ulrika Eleonora Church was being demolished and until the consecration of the new cathedral. The bells of the old church were reused in the cathedral. Construction of the cathedral began in 1830, although it was only officially inaugurated in 1852. Engel died in 1840.

The building was later altered by Engel's successor Ernst Lohrmann, whose four small domes emphasise the architectural connection to the cathedral's models, Saint Isaac's Cathedral and Kazan Cathedral in St. Petersburg. Lohrmann also designed two extra buildings to the sides of the steps: looking from the square the left building is a bell tower and the right building a chapel. He also erected larger-than-life sized zinc statues of the Twelve Apostles at the apexes and corners of the roofline in 1849. They were sculpted by August Wredov and Hermann Schievelbein and cast by S. P. Devaranne in Berlin in 1845–1847. The altarpiece was painted by Carl Timoleon von Neff and donated to the church by Emperor Nicholas I. The cathedral crypt was renovated in the 1980s by architects Vilhelm Helander and Juha Leiviskä for use in exhibitions and church functions; Helander was also responsible for conservation repairs on the cathedral in the late 1990s.

Today, the cathedral is one of Helsinki's most popular tourist attractions. In 2018 there were half a million visitors. The church is in regular use for services of worship and special events such as weddings.

In popular culture

The opening sequence of the music video for "Sandstorm" by Darude was filmed on Senate Square, prominently featuring the Cathedral in the background.

Gallery

See also

 Saint Isaac's Cathedral (Saint Petersburg)
 Trinity Cathedral, Saint Petersburg
 Uspenski Cathedral
 St. Henry's Cathedral
 Holy Trinity Church, Helsinki

References

External links
 
 Panoramic view of Helsinki Cathedral

Carl Ludvig Engel buildings
Churches completed in 1852
19th-century Lutheran churches
Lutheran churches in Helsinki
Lutheran cathedrals in Finland
Church buildings with domes
Kruununhaka
1852 establishments in the Russian Empire
Neoclassical church buildings in Finland